Chiara Lubich (born Silvia Lubich; January 22, 1920, Trento – March 14, 2008, Rocca di Papa), was an Italian teacher and author who founded the Focolare Movement, which aims to bring unity among people and promote universal family.

She was a charismatic figure who broke with many female stereotypes as early as the 1940s, opening a previously unheard of role for women in society and the Roman Catholic Church.

Lubich is considered a notable figure in ecumenical, interreligious and intercultural dialogue, as recognized by UNESCO, which awarded her the Prize for Peace Education in 1996; and the Council of Europe, with the Human Rights Award in 1998; among others.

She took her place in the history of contemporary spirituality among teachers and mystics for the authentic Gospel-based inspiration, universal outlook, and cultural and social influence that distinguish her charism, spirituality, and work.

Early life
The second of four children, Lubich was baptised Silvia. Her mother Luigia Marinconz, was a fervent Catholic, while her father Luigi, was a socialist and convinced anti-fascist. She later took the religious name “Chiara” upon entering the Franciscan Third Order (1942-1949).

Luigi Lubich worked as a typesetter for the socialist newspaper Il Popolo, directed by Cesare Battisti. After the suppression of the newspaper by the Italian fascist regime, he opened an export business of Italian wines into Germany, but due to the crisis of 1929, he was forced to close it. Having refused to become a member of the National Fascist Party, he found it impossible to get work and had to resort to doing odd jobs to support his family. Thus, the family lived in financial hardship for years. Her mother and the local Sisters of the Child Mary provided her with a solid formation in the Christian faith. She developed a strong sense of social justice from her father; her brother Gino, who was also a socialist; and the family's life of poverty, becoming very sensitive to the needs of the poor. At the age of 15, she joined the ranks of Catholic Action in Trento and soon became a diocesan youth leader.

Education and teaching career 
Chiara attended a teachers’ college and became a passionate student of philosophy. Her great desire was to attend the Catholic University of Milan, but she failed to win a scholarship. Initially deeply distressed, she suddenly felt consoled by an inner certainty from God: "I will be your teacher." As soon as she graduated, she took jobs teaching in elementary schools in the valley regions around Trento (1938–39), and then in Cognola (1940-1943), a town close to Trento, in a school for orphans run by the Capuchins. In the autumn of 1943, she left teaching and enrolled at the Ca'Foscari University of Venice, continuing to give private lessons. However, due to the circumstances of the war, at the end of 1944, she had to interrupt her studies.

Founding Focolare: 1942-1951 
Focolare was founded against the backdrop of the horrors of World War II. In the midst of this, Chiara discovered the life-giving alternative: God, who is Love. It would become the inspiring spark for the movement for peace and unity that would later emerge. In autumn of 1942, in the wake of a simple conversation about the love of God with a Capuchin friar, Casimiro Bonetti, he proposed that Silvia enter the Franciscan Third Order. Attracted by Clare of Assisi's radical choice of God, she took the name “Chiara,” which is Italian for “Clare”. Her experience of God's love was the topic of conferences she gave to the young women of the Third Order. Among them was Natalia Dallapiccola, who, at the age of 18, was the first to follow Lubich.

Lessons from the war 
On September 2, 1943, Anglo-American forces began bombing Trento, which took it by surprise. Following the armistice between Italy and the Allies, the territory around Trento was occupied by Nazi forces and annexed to the Third Reich. Her brother Gino joined the communist partisans and fought against the Nazi-fascist regime. In the summer of 1944, he was arrested and tortured. Amidst the uncertainty about the future and fear for life itself caused by the war, Chiara realized how everything passes, everything collapses, everything is “vanity of vanities” (Eccl 1:1) and “only God remains.” She became convinced that “the salvation of the twentieth century is love”. She shared this great news with “letters of fire” that she wrote to her relatives, to the young women of the Third Order, and to her colleagues. Soon other young women joined her in living what they called a “divine adventure”.

On December 7, 1943, in the chapel of the Capuchin College, she pronounced her total “Yes, forever” with a vow of perpetual chastity.

A revolution born from the Gospel 
As she and her first companions ran to the air-raid shelters, they took only a copy of the Gospel, which they read and tried to put it into practice. In 1948 she wrote: "We have understood that the world needs to be healed by the Gospel because only the Good News can give back to the world the life it lacks. This is why we live the Word of Life (…). We have no other book except the Gospel, no other science, no other art. That is where life is!"

Chiara and her early friends dedicated themselves to the people in the poorest sections of Trento, recognizing in them the presence of Jesus. Thanks to a growing number of people being involved, food, clothing and medicine arrived with unusual abundance. Chiara made a plan, with the goal of “solving the social problems of Trento”. In 1947, it took shape as “Fraternity in action". In February 1948, in an editorial signed by Silvia Lubich, which appeared in L'Amico Serafico, the magazine of the Capuchin Fathers, she announced the communion of goods to all those around her, following the example of the first Christians. After only a few months, close to 500 people were involved in a widespread sharing of material and spiritual goods.

Living for the unity of the human family 
In that dark time without much hope for the future, a universal project opened up for Chiara:

For Chiara, “that they may all be one” could mean nothing less than the unity of all humankind. Unity with God and among human beings could be achieved on one condition: by embracing the cross. Chiara focused on “Jesus Forsaken”. Gradually she and her companions realized that in that moment Jesus had transformed all forms of pain and suffering into “new life” and healed all the traumas of division. Years later,she would affirm: Jesus Forsaken won every battle in us, even the most terrible ones (…). But it is necessary to be madly in love with him, who is the synthesis of every physical or spiritual suffering, the remedy (…) for every pain of the soul."

"We experienced joy, new peace, the fullness of life, an unmistakable light. Jesus was fulfilling his promise: ‘Where two or more are gathered in my name, I am there among them’ (Matt 18:20). He is the one who binds us into unity with the Father, and into unity among us, the unity which had been impossible until now."

Chiara understood that the unity that she and her first companions were experiencing was destined for the whole world. In 1946 she already proposed that they aim at universal brotherhood, indicating the way that this can be done. "Look at all people as children of the one Father. Let our thoughts and the affection of our hearts go beyond the barriers imposed by our human vision of life, and develop the habit of constantly opening ourselves to the reality of being one human family in only one Father: God."

While Chiara and her first companions believed they were simply living the Gospel, the phrases that were coming into relief formed the basic principles of a spirituality of unity or “spirituality of communion”. This spirituality would be recognized by the Catholic Church and leaders of other Christian Churches as a gift of the Holy Spirit for our age. Chiara gradually deepened these principles in her spiritual writings. The spirituality of unity developed as a rich and solid synthesis of Christian experience, a remarkable patrimony of ideas and life experiences, with a distinctly communitarian character. Twenty years later, it proved to be in total harmony with the documents of the Second Vatican Council. It has also had a social, cultural, political and economic impact on society.

A decisive choice 

On May 13, 1944, the city of Trento was subjected to heavy bombing. The Lubich home was also damaged to the point of being uninhabitable. The family decided to look for shelter in a mountain village, while Chiara made the difficult choice to stay in the city to support the increasingly numerous group of young women who were inspired by her actions and her words. While she was going through the streets, looking for her friends, a woman, distraught with grief, grabbed her by the shoulders, shouting at her that four of her family members had been killed. For Chiara, this was a call to set aside her own pain to take on the pain of humanity.

In the autumn of 1944, Chiara was offered a small apartment in Piazza Cappuccini, where she went to live with some of her companions. This would be the seed of a small and rather unique community. The warmth of their love earned them the nickname, “focolare”, the Italian word for “hearth". Even though they had no intention of starting anything, this small household marked the first basic structure of the newly born Movement. It would constitute its heart, its backbone. In the autumn of 1948, a young electrician, Marco Tecilla, and a merchant, Livio Fauri, decided to follow Chiara's new communitarian way and formed the first men's focolare community. In 1953, the focolare household would acquire its definitive form when also married people became full members of the community while remaining faithful to the obligations of their married life. The first to follow this path was Igino Giordani, the pioneer for a vocation that would be followed by numerous married people who are eager for spiritual perfection.

Years of difficult trials 
The terrible reality of the war was not the only difficulty they would have. Starting in 1945, criticisms, misunderstandings and accusations began to spread against this “new community” in Trento. Living the Gospel, communicating experiences, sharing their few possessions and making unity their ideal, aroused suspicions of Protestantism or a new form of communism.  Their radical way of living the Gospel that Chiara proposed attracted the accusation of “fanaticism”, and the word “love”, not customarily used in the Catholic sphere at that time, was likewise misunderstood.

“Whoever listens to you listens to Me” (Luke 10:16). This sentence from the Gospel of Luke motivated Chiara to go with her companions to see the bishop of Trento, Carlo De Ferrari. He listened to them, got more information about their life and then reassured them. He also confirmed that this was something new that was developing and should be separate from the Franciscan Third Order. In fact, on May 1, 1947, Archbishop De Ferrari approved the Statute of the “Focolare of Charity - Apostles of Unity.” In March 1949, a decree of the Vatican department for religious ratified the distinction of the “Focolare of Charity” from the Franciscan Third Order.
The charges against them, however, did not cease. During the 1950s, when movements were a new phenomenon in the Church, certain Vatican offices regarded the Focolare Movement with suspicion. In 1951, the Holy Office (now known as the Congregation of the Doctrine of the Faith) began a long study and a series of interviews to test the young founder. During this time, it was uncertain whether the movement would be disbanded or approved.

Papal approvals 
The trial came to an end gradually, starting with the first pontifical approval ad experimentum in 1962, during the pontificate of Pope John XXIII, at about the same time that he opened the Second Vatican Council. Further approval was given by Pope Paul VI in 1964. In 1990, Pope John Paul II approved the Statutes that outline the composite physiognomy of the Focolare Movement as it developed over the years. As early as 1984, John Paul II recognized in the charism of Chiara a “radicalism of love”, juxtaposing it with that of Ignatius of Loyola and other founders. The following year, in answer to a question posed to him by Chiara, he gave his support to the idea that in the future the head of the Movement would always be a woman, even though Focolare includes priests, men and women religious, and bishops. His answer was: “Indeed! I see you [the Focolare] as an expression of the Church’s Marian profile”. In that same year, John Paul II named her as a consultant for the Pontifical Council for the Laity. Chiara addressed the synods of the bishops in 1985, 1987 and 1999.

The meeting with Igino Giordani 
Various circumstances led Chiara to move from Trento to Rome. Looking for help to find an apartment in postwar Rome, she asked for an appointment with Igino Giordani (1884-1980), a prominent figure in Parliament. The meeting took place on September 17, 1948. Giordani, who was married and father of four children, was a prolific author, journalist, pioneer of ecumenism, scholar and expert in the history of the Church, and therefore able to understand the novelty that the spirituality offered.  At the age of 56, he decided there and then to follow her, while remaining with his family, but becoming a spiritual member of the community of consecrated virgins. He was the first in this vocation of “married Focolarini”, an original way of consecration open to married people, as individuals or as a couple. Giordani would also contribute greatly to the development of ecumenism within the Movement, as well as to the civic and social dimension of the spirituality, so much so that he was considered by Chiara co-founder of the Movement. The process of his beatification is currently underway.

A special period of light 
After years of intense activity, in the summer of 1949, Chiara went with her companions for a period of rest to a town near Trento called Tonadico. It was a mystical experience and has since been referred to simply as “Paradise ’49”. She understood more about God’s plans for the Focolare Movement and its future developments. During those few months, Chiara constantly communicated with Igino Giordani, who had returned to Rome for his work. She would immediately share whatever she understood with the young women who were with her, in such a vital way that they had the impression of participating with her in the same experience. It was the founding experience of the new communitarian spirituality and the ecclesial reality that it would generate.

Development
In September 1949, Chiara returned to Rome from the mountains and a new stage began. Before the year end, she met a young man from Pistoia (central Italy), Pasquale Foresi (1929-2015). He was destined to become one of Chiara's closest collaborators, whom she considered a co-founder, alongside Igino Giordani.

The Movement had spread rapidly throughout Italy in the post-war period. In 1958, members of the Movement began to travel to other continents at the request of people who wanted to know more about it. In 1958, it reached various countries in South America, in 1961 North America, in 1963 Africa, in 1966 Asia and 1967 Australia.

Mariapolis 
Every summer between 1950 and 1959, in the mountain villages near Trento, people from all walks of life joined Chiara and the members of the movement to live this new lifestyle, while enjoying a holiday atmosphere together. They came from Italy, France and Germany, from other countries of Europe and other continents. The first multicultural scale model of a society renewed by the Gospel took shape spontaneously and was given the name “Mariapolis” (“city of Mary”). In 1953, among other politicians, Alcide De Gasperi, then Prime Minister of Italy, attended the Mariapolis. In 1959, over 10,000 people came to the Valley of Primiero from 27 nations,including Czechoslovakia, Brazil, and Taiwan.
The following year, at the Mariapolis in Fribourg, Switzerland, Chiara spoke to a group of politicians of the day when all nations would live in unity, foreseeing “a new era”: "The time has come when the homeland of others has to be loved as one’s own. Today the times require us to have the social responsibility to build up, not only our own country but that of others, too."

The Focolare magazine, entitled Città Nuova (“New City”), began at the 1956 Mariapolis from the desire of people to stay connected to the spirituality and the movement as a whole. In one of its first editorials, Chiara expressed her vision for it: "We would like to collect all the various experiences of people who are bringing unity all over the world (…) so that the good that one person does will become the common good and the common good will belong to each individual."

A Work “under construction” 
Chiara often described herself as a simple instrument in the hands of the artist. After the pontifical approval in 1962, the movement began to develop at a surprisingly rapid rate, resulting in the formation of various branches for more committed members and of movements for wider outreach. Chiara repeated several times that she never had a plan or an agenda:

1956: “The Volunteers of God” for a New Humanity 
In November 1956, an uprising of the Hungarian people was brutally suppressed. Chiara responded by calling for an army of volunteers for the cause of God, “volunteers of God”: "A certain society has attempted to erase the name of God, the reality of God, the providence of God and the love of God from people’s hearts. There has to be a society that can put God back in his rightful place (…). A society that witnesses to only one name: God." 

Thus, the“volunteers of God” came to life, the first of 18 branches within the Focolare Movement.
Groups met according to their area of engagement and, with Chiara's inspiration, began centers for politics, economy, medicine, and art. These later developed into a wider movement that Chiara launched in 1968 with the name “For a New Society” and later changed to “New Humanity.

Youth and the Gospel revolution 
In 1967, Chiara proposed to young people a revolution of love, based on the Gospel. She issued a strong appeal for young people of the world to unite. She pointed to a new model of person needed for this era, the “Global Person” with the whole world in their heart. In 1985, an even broader youth movement began, called “Youth for a United World” for young adults, while a year before, in 1984, Chiara had started “Teens for Unity,” for teens and children to build peace everywhere and to spread a culture of giving.

New Families Movement 
On July 19, 1967, Chiara announced the beginning of a movement for families. She asked couples who were living the spirituality of unity to reach out to all couples, but especially to focus on those who most reflected the suffering of Jesus abandoned on the cross. Groups formed all over the world, and hundreds of social projects to support family life, providing concrete help for those in need and sponsoring children with their “Adoptions-at-a-Distance” project, and International Adoptions.

Towards the Church as communion 
Ever since the early years of the movement in Trento, Chiara had frequent contacts with men and women religious of various congregations as well as diocesan priests. She encouraged them to implement in their communities and parishes the last desire of Jesus, “Father, that they may all be one.” This led to a widespread movement among religious and priests at large, while branches developed for those who wanted to commit to living the spirituality according to their vocation and their founder's spirit.

“Operation Africa”
In 1964, during the Second Vatican Council, Bishop Julius Peeters from Cameroon asked Chiara about the possibility of sending medical help to a region of his country where the people were at risk of disease. She requested some of the Focolare members who were doctors or nurses to go to the village of Fontem. They discovered that vaccinating the population helped immensely to improve their situation. Seeing their great need, Chiara launched “Operation Africa” among the youth of the movement, who raised money to build a hospital and then schools for the village. She went in person to visit the Bangwa people in Fontem in 1966, 1969 and 2000. Fontem is the site of Mary Health of Africa mission hospital. a 120-bed hospital that also has an extensive outpatient service and runs a dispensary in nearby Fonjumetaw.

Eastern Europe
Starting in 1955, with the encouragement of Pope Pius XII and the German bishops, some men and women members of the Focolare moved to Czecho-Slovakia and then into East Germany and other neighboring countries. Chiara gave them precise directions - be perfect workers; live mutual love and love each neighbor without speaking about it; respect the laws of the country. She traveled to Berlin nine times, both before and after the wall had been constructed. In 1990, when travel outside their countries was permitted, several hundred youths from eastern Europe were able to participate in the GenFest in Rome. In August 1991, in Katowice, Poland, 6,500 members of the Focolare Movement, coming from Eastern European countries belonging to the communist bloc, met for the first time with Chiara and with one another.

For an Economy of Communion 
In May 1991, Chiara arrived in São Paulo, Brazil, to meet with the members of the Movement there. The idea emerged for a project called the “Economy of Communion” (EOC) in which businesses would, first of all, live the spirit of unity among their employees, competitors, and customers, and then share part of their profits to raise people out of poverty and form a “culture of giving” rather than of “having”. It stimulated.  the interest of academics who have studied the praxis being used and are presenting a new economic theory in universities worldwide. Chiara was awarded several honorary doctorates in economics and, in 1999, presented the Economy of Communion at the 50th anniversary of the Council of Europe in Strasbourg, France. In October 1998, Fernando Cardoso, president of the Federal Republic of Brazil presented Chiara with the highest award of his country, the “National Order of the Southern Cross, ”recognizing the EOC as “an innovative and effective weapon in the struggle against poverty and exclusion”

Politics for unity 
Chiara was invited to speak to a meeting of Italian politicians of various parties. It was May 2, 1996, in Naples. Her proposal to them was that, first of all, they should live fraternity among themselves and then bring this spirit to all their relationships with other politicians of different parties, with the goal that together they might achieve the common good. This gave shape to the Movement of Politics and Policy for Unity (MppU). Chiara outlined its fundamental features on several occasions when she met members of the government in Slovenia, Spain, France, the Czech Republic, Brazil (1998) and Italy (2000).

During her visit to Ireland in 2004, she met President Mary McAleese. Visiting the focolare center near Dublin in 2008, McAleese spoke of Lubich's “simple and beautiful idea of love as a lived reality leading to unity. Ideas such as hers” she added, “provide an antidote to the negative ideas that spread so easily, causing damage, breaking hearts and lives”. 
That same year (2004) Chiara visited England and spoke in the House of Commons in Westminster on the topic “Liberty and equality...What happened to fraternity” She also addressed a symposium at the United Nations in New York, sponsored by the Permanent Observer Mission of the Holy See in conjunction with the World Conference of Religions for Peace (WCRP) with the title “A Unity of Nations and a Unity of Peoples”. In November 2001, she was invited to a major conference held in Vienna, Austria, entitled “1,000 cities for Europe,” where she proposed “the spirit of universal brotherhood in politics as a key to the unity of Europe and the world.” On September 12, 2004, she gave was to be her last public address, in Rome, on the occasion of the second international Interdependence Day.

An interdisciplinary culture 
At the beginning of the 1990s, at the urging of Bishop Klaus Hemmerle, Bishop of Aachen in Germany, Chiara gathered together scholars in a variety of disciplines who had been living the Focolare spirituality for some years. They formed what is called the “Abba’ School,” an interdisciplinary study center, to draw out a doctrine from the illuminations received during the summer of 1949. In December 2007, the pontifically approved Sophia University Institute was established in the Movement’s small town of Loppiano, near Florence, offering interdisciplinary graduate programs based on the culture of unity.

“A Woman of Dialogue” 
Throughout her life, Chiara became a protagonist and often a forerunner of a 360-degree dialogue among civil and religious leaders, movements and individuals within the Catholic Church, with Christians of different Churches, with followers of other religions and also with people without a religious affiliation. A “dialogue of life” helps people to meet and, even though they have different ideas, to speak with a sincere love for the other person, to find some point of agreement that can clarify misunderstandings, calm disputes, resolve conflicts, and even at times eliminate hatred.

Chiara had many practical ideas about how to develop a fruitful dialogue. She explained:

This attitude suggested by Chiara also eliminates any idea of winning the other person over to one's religion or point of view. Instead, it leads people who were strangers to discover that they are all brothers and sisters in the one human family. Pope John Paul II defined the members of the Focolare Movement as “apostles of dialogue”

Reconciliation among Christians 
As everything in Chiara's experience, the ecumenical stage of the Movement began with a personal contact. In 1961, a group of Lutheran nuns invited her to Darmstadt in Germany to share with them the principles of her spirituality. Some Lutheran pastors were also present and were so struck by her radical evangelical lifestyle that they expressed the desire to spread this spirituality among Lutherans. In 2008, in his tribute to Chiara, the General Secretary of the World Lutheran Federation (LWF), Rev. Dr. Ishmael Noko, said: “Many in the Lutheran communion have drawn inspiration from this laywoman”.
In 1966, in London, Chiara had an audience with the Archbishop of Canterbury, Dr. Michael Ramsey, Primate of the Anglican Communion, and subsequently with his successors. The former Archdeacon of Canterbury, Bernard Pawley, once described the Focolare as having “burst forth in the Church like a fountain of living water from the Gospel.”

From 1967 to 1972, she traveled to Istanbul eight times, where she engaged in a deep fraternal dialogue with the Ecumenical Patriarch of Constantinople, Athenagoras I, with whom she had 24 audiences over the years. This dialogue continued with his successors, DemetriosI and Bartholomew I.
Chiara also formed a deep and lasting friendship with Frère Roger Schutz, founder of the ecumenical community of Taizé. 
Since 1967, she had contacts with the Ecumenical Council of Churches based in Geneva, Switzerland. Rev. Dr. Samuel Kobia, General Secretary of WCC in 2008, wrote in testimony of Chiara's life: “Chiara Lubich had a profound impact on the ecumenical movement and helped significantly to foster viable relationships between churches of different Christian traditions. (…) Our love for Chiara and immense gratitude for the gift of God she has been to the ecumenical movement will continue to motivate and inspire us in our work for the visible unity of the Church”.

In all of these contacts, Chiara referred her activities to the Pontifical Council for Promoting Christian Unity, where she received full support. She also felt confirmed in this work by all the modern Popes, beginning with Pope John XXIII who had placed Christian unity as one of the first goals for the Second Vatican Council.

Communion with Catholic ecclesial movements and new communities 
On the eve of Pentecost 1998, in St. Peter's Square in Rome, Pope John Paul II held the first large meeting of ecclesial movements and new communities, with the presence of 250,000 people from many nations of the world. In his address, he said: “The institutional and charismatic aspects are co-essential in the Church’s constitution. They contribute, although differently, to the life, renewal, and sanctification of God’s People. It is from this providential rediscovery of the Church’s charismatic dimension that, before and after the Council, a remarkable pattern of growth has been established for ecclesial movements and new communities”. And he added: “The Church expects from you mature fruits of communion and commitment. Chiara addressed the Pope with three other founders, Fr. Luigi Giussani (Communion and Liberation), Jean Vanier (L’Arche) and Kiko Argüello (Neocatechumenal Way) and she assured him that she would work for the unity among the movements. From then on, she dedicated herself with a particular passion to increasing the communion among the founders, directors, and members of movements and new communities.

“Together for Europe” 
The experience of Catholic movements coming together inspired members of other Christian movements who asked to join them. Since 1999, a network of collaboration among Catholic and Lutheran movements and communities was formed and gradually spread to many other groups and movements in Christian Churches throughout Europe. The result has been an ongoing project of working together called “Together for Europe”. It is ecumenical, but also includes political leaders, and the goal is to contribute toward giving “a new soul to the old continent,” considering the difficult process of integrating eastern and western Europe. The first major event took place in Stuttgart in 2004 with Chiara as one of the main speakers. 9,000 people participated while 163 similar events were held simultaneously in other locations.

Dialogue with members of other religions 
The door to interreligious dialogue opened, quite unexpectedly, in London, 1977, when Chiara received the Templeton Prize for Progress in Religion (now simply known as the “Templeton Prize”). In her acceptance speech, she outlined her Christian experience and mentioned that the Focolare Movement also had contacts with Jews, Muslims, and Buddhists, since friendships had developed in countries where these religious groups are present. She also quoted some of the great mystics of other religions who exalt love as the essence of all being. The response from religious leaders present was beyond anything she would have expected and for her was a sign that the Movement had to develop its interreligious dialogue.

In 1981, Chiara was invited to Tokyo by Nikkyo Niwano, the founder of Risshō KōseiKai, a lay Buddhist movement, to offer her spiritual experience to 10,000 Buddhists gathered in a prestigious Buddhist temple. It was the first time a Christian woman had spoken there. The impact was great and many of those present said that it helped them to appreciate the basic tenets of Christianity.

In January 1997, she went to Chiang Mai in Thailand, where she had been asked to address 800 Buddhist monks and nuns. Again, she was the first Christian and the first laywoman to address them. Their Great Teacher, Ajahn Thong, explained, “The wise person is neither male nor female. When someone turns on a light in the darkness, one does not ask if the one who lit it was a man or a woman. Chiara is here to give us the light she has experienced”.

In May of that same year, she was invited to the Malcolm Shabazz Mosque in New York, where once again she simply shared her Christian experience with 3,000 Muslims, referencing quotes from Islam that were similar to the Gospel, to which the crowd responded, “God is great!” At the end of the meeting, she made a pact of fraternity with their leader, Imam Warith Deen Mohammed.
Three years later, they met again in Washington DC, with 6000 Christians and Muslims to celebrate an event called “Faith Communities Together”. Since then, this initiative has been repeated throughout the United States in many cities, bringing together the two communities for fellowship and common concrete projects.

In Buenos Aires, in April 1998, Chiara met members of the Jewish community of Argentina and Uruguay at the invitation of the B'nai B'rith and other Jewish organizations.

In 2001, she took her first trip to India invited by Kala Acharya, director of the Bharatiya Sanskriti Peetham University in Mumbai, who said, “It is time to break down the walls of separation and discover the garden of the other”. Two prestigious Hindu-Gandhian institution sin Tamil Nadu conferred on her the “Defender of Peace” Award. She returned in 2003 on the invitation of the leader of a vast Hindu movement, the Swadhyaya Movement.

In 2002, among the official testimonies for peace offered by the representatives of the various churches and religions at the Day of Prayer for Peace in Assisi, presided over by Pope John Paul II, Chiara and Andrea Riccardi, founder of the Saint Egidio Community, gave the address on behalf of the Catholic Church. 
In 2004, at Westminster Central Hall in London, Chiara, speaking to a large audience of people of various religions and cultures, proposed a strategy of fraternal love that could mark a turning point for international relations, “because fraternity is God’s plan for the whole human family”.

Dialogue with persons with no religious affiliation 
In 1978, Chiara inaugurated the Focolare center for dialogue with persons who profess no particular faith, but who follow their conscience and are committed to living and spreading the great common values of humanity. Groups were formed of persons with religious faith and those of other convictions, but who all share the same desire to work for universal brotherhood in the world and to recompose the unity of the human family. On the occasion of their first congress in 1992, Chiara told them: “You are an essential part of the Focolare Movement because the values of solidarity and justice that you promote contribute to the project of unity which is the goal of this Movement”.

Dialogue with contemporary culture 
Chiara soon realized that the spirituality of unity has something to offer to every profession and area of engagement in society. People began to meet with others in their field of work so that groups formed to increase unity and fraternal love within their profession or area of work. They promote scholarly research to bring the values of love of neighbor and unity to bear on the normal practice of medicine, education, art, sports, ecology, psychology, economics, politics, etc. and also sponsor conferences, training courses and various publications on these topics.

Final years

The “night of God” and the “night of our age” 

For Chiara, as for Mother Teresa of Calcutta and other persons of great spiritual depth, a biography cannot keep silent about a “hidden” side of their life, a mysterious aspect, but of considerable importance. Since the time of Saint John of the Cross, these have been called “nights” of the soul in the language of mysticism. Chiara said that her life was marked by “luminous peaks of love and the dark depths of pain. 
A climax came for her when she experienced the “night of God,” the last serious trial at the end of her life, from 2004–2008. It seemed to her that “God had disappeared, like the sun disappearing over the horizon and no longer seen”. 
It was a personal “night”, but she also saw it projected onto the “night of our age.” Once again, Chiara found the way out of this trial by embracing Jesus on the cross, who in the “darkest possible night” felt abandoned by his Father. She pointed out “signs of the resurrection” in many aspects of her work, particularly in the fields of politics, economics, communication, interreligious and cultural dialogue. She felt that these “resurrections” came from the faithful love for Jesus forsaken amid pain and darkness. This was her last public message, concluding with:

The last greeting 
After a long period (from September 2004) in which her health failed, at the beginning of February 2008, Chiara was admitted to the Agostino Gemelli University Hospital in Rome. During her stay, she received a visit from the Ecumenical Patriarch of Constantinople, Bartholomew I, and a letter from Pope Benedict XVI. On March 13, 2008, since nothing more could be done for her medically, she was discharged and returned to her home in Rocca di Papa, where she peacefully died the next day, March 14, at the age of 88.

Her funeral was celebrated in Rome, on March 18, at the Basilica of Saint Paul Outside the Walls. Thousands of people packed the church and overflowed outside where large screens had been set up to allow them to follow the service. Civic leaders as well as prominent figures from the Catholic Church, many other Christian churches and other religions, attended and offered their testimony to her life. An eminent Thai Buddhist monk, Phara-Maha Thongratana, commented: “Now Chiara and her great Ideal are the legacies of the whole of humanity.” News of her funeral was reported internationally.
Cardinal Tarcisio Bertone, then-Secretary of State of the Vatican, read the letter from Pope Benedict XVI, who said among other things:

On January 27, 2015, the cause for her beatification and canonization was opened with a message from Pope Francis which highlights its motivation: “to make known to the people of God the life and works of one who, by accepting the invitation of the Lord, has turned on a new light for the path to unity in the Church”. November 10, 2019, marked the end of the diocesan phase, with the cause being transferred to the Congregation of the Cause of Saints at the Vatican.

Acknowledgments

From civil institutions and heads of state 

 UNESCO:1996 Prize for Peace Education, December 1996
 Council of Europe:1998 Human Rights Prize, September 1998
 Brazil: National Order of the Southern Cross, the Federal Republic of Brazil, presented by the President of the Republic, Fernando Henrique Cardoso,October 1998
 Germany: Grand Merit Cross from the Federal Republic of Germany, presented by the President of the Republic, Johanne Rau, June 2000
 Taiwan: Order of the Brilliant Star of the Republic of China, February 2001
 Italy: Knight of the Great Cross Order of Merit of the Italian Republic, presented by the President of the Republic, Carlo Azeglio Ciampi, March 2004

Honorary citizenships 
 Italy: Rocca di Papa, 1995; Pompei, 1996; Rimini, 1997; Palrmo,1998; Rome, 2000; Florence, 2000; Incisa Valdarno, 2000; Rovigo, 2000; Genoa, 2001; Turin, 2002; Milan, 2004; La Spezia, 2006
 Brazil: Vargem G. Paulista, 1998; Manues Amazonia, 1998; Paragominas Parà, 1998; Bela Vista do Toldosc, 1998; Amanindena Parà, 2002
 Argentina: Buenos Aires, 1998; Chacabuco, 1998; Santiago de Estero, 1998
 Philippines: Tagaytay, 1997
 Hungary: Janoshalma, 2008

Significant awards 
 Italy: Sienna, Silver Cateriniana Plaque from St. Catherine Center, September 1987
 Italy: Florence, Casentino Literary Award from the Michelangelo Cultural Center, July 1987
 Italy: Trento, Burning Eagle of St. Wenceslaus, January 1995; Gold Medal of St. Virgilius, 1995
 Italy: Milan, Author of the Year Award from the Union of Italian Catholic Publishers and Booksellers, March 1995
 Italy: Bologna, Silver Turret Award, September 1997
 Argentina: Illustrious Visitor, Government of the City of Buenos Aires, April 1998
 Brazil:Coat of Arms of the city of Belém,December 1998
 Slovenia: Medal of Saints Cyril and Methodius,April 1999
 Republic of Cameroon: Conferral of title, MafuaNdem (Queen sent by God) by the Fon of Fontem, king of theBangwa, Lucas Njifua, Fontem, May 2000
 Italy: Liguria Region, Award for peace and solidarity, December 2001
  Italy: Lombardy Region, Rosa Camuna Award, November 2003
 Italy: Brescia, Paul VI Goodness Award, 2005
 USA: Lifetime Achievement Award, Family Theater Productions, Hollywood, July 2006

For interreligious dialogue 
 England: Templeton Prize for Progress in Religion, from the Templeton Foundation, London, April 1977
 Italy:“An olive tree for peace,”Jewish Community of Rome, planted in Rocca di Papa, October 1995
 Italy: Civilization of Love award for interreligious dialogue, from the International Civilization of Love Forum, Rieti, June 1996
 Brazil: Plaque for Promoting Interreligious Dialogue and a Culture of Peace, Respect and Fraternity, from the Christian-Jewish Fraternal Council, Sao Paulo, April 1998
 USA: Plaque for Love of Neighbor and Solidarity with Muslim communities of Imam W.D. Mohammed, Malcolm Shabazz Mosque in Harlem, New York, May 1999
 India: Defender of Peace Award, Gandhian-Hindu movements, Shanti Ashram and Sarvodaya, Coimbatore, January 2001
 India: Citation in honor of Chiara Lubich,SomayiaBharatiyaSanskritiPeethamUniversity,Mumbai, January 2001
 USA: Crystal of recognition for excellent service to humanity in the field of religion,the Muslim community, Chicago, May 2004

For ecumenical dialogue

The Anglican Communion 
 Cross of the Order of St. Augustine of Canterbury from the Primate of the Anglican Church, Archbishop Robert Runcie, London, 1981; 
 Golden Cross of the Order of St. Augustine of Canterbury from the Primate of the Anglican Church, Archbishop George Carey, London, 1996.

Greek Orthodox Church 
Byzantine Cross, from the Ecumenical Patriarchs of Constantinople, Dimitrios I, in Istanbul, 1984, and Bartholomew I in Istanbul, 1995.

Evangelical Lutheran Churches 
 Augsburg Peace Prize, “for special achievement ininterconfessional agreements,” at a common celebration of Lutherans and Catholics, Augsburg, Germany, October 1988

From academic institutions

Honorary Doctorates Honoris Causa 
 Poland: Social Sciences, Catholic University of Lublin, June 19, 1996
 Thailand: Social Communications, St. John University, Bangkok, January 5, 1997
 Philippines: Theology, Pontifical and Royal University of Santo Tomas, Manila, January 14, 1997
 Taiwan: Theology, Fu Jen Catholic University, Taipei, January 1997
 USA:Humane Letters, Sacred Heart University, Fairfield, Connecticut, promoted by Rabbi Jack Bemporad, director of the Center for Christian-Jewish Understanding at this University, May 21, 1997
 Mexico: Philosophy,La Salle University, Mexico City, June 6, 1997
 Argentina: Dialogue with Contemporary Culture,State University of Buenos Aires, April 6, 1998
 Brazil: Humanities and Religious Sciences, Pontifical Catholic University of São Paulo, April 29, 1998; Economics, Catholic University of Pernambuco, May 9, 1998
 Italy:Business and Economics, Catholic University of the Sacred Heart, Milan, conferred at the Piacenza Campus, January 29, 1999
 Malta: Psychology, University of Malta, February 26, 1999
 USA:Education, Catholic University of America, Washington, November 2000
 Slovakia: Theology, University of Trnava, June 23, 2003
 Italy: Theology of Consecrated Life, the Claretian Institute of the Theology of the Consecrated Life, a Pontifical Lateran University, Rome, October 25, 2004
 Venezuela: Art,Cecilio Acosta Catholic University, Maracaibo,November 18, 2006
 England:Divinity, Liverpool Hope University, delivered by the rector at Lubich's home in Rocca di Papa, January 5, 2008

From cultural institutions 
 Italy: Prize for Dialogue among Peoples, International Franciscan Study Center, Massa Carrara, October 1993
 Brazil: Medal of Honor,State University of São Paulo (USP), April 1998
 Argentina: Medal of Honor,Pontifical Catholic University of Argentina, Buenos Aires, April 1998
 Italy: The Trento Person of the Year Award from the Person-City-Territory Cultural Association, Trento, June 2001
 Italy: Stefano Borgia Award for intercultural and interreligious dialogue from the International Centre for Borgian Studies, Velletri, November 2001 
 Italy: Honorary member of the Luigi Getta Study Centre, Rome, March 2003
 Venezuela: Establishment of the “Chiara Lubich”Free Chair of Studies,Cecilio Acosta Catholic University, Maracaibo, February 2005
 Paraguay: Thomas More Award,Our Lady of the Assumption Catholic University, Asunción, December 27, 2006
 Brazil: Medal of Honor, State University of Sao Paulo, April 1998; “Chiara Lubich” Chair in Fraternity and Humanism, Recife Catholic University, March 25, 2014

International honors 
 Argentina: Illustrious Visitor, Government of the City of Buenos Aires, April 1998
 Brazil:Coat of Arms of the city of Belém,December 1998
 Italy: Telamon International Peace Award, Social Programming Center, Agrigento, July 1999 
 Republic of Cameroon: Conferral of title, MafuaNdem (Queen sent by God) by the Fon of Fontem, king of theBangwa, Lucas Njifua, Fontem, May 2000
 Italy: City of Peace Award, Castelgandolfo, April 2003
 Italy: CivisTusculanus Award, Frascati, September 2004
 Switzerland: Bourgeoisie of honor presented by the Mayor of Mollens, August 2007

Publications 
Declared the author of the year 1995 with the UELCI Prize, Chiara Lubich authored 58 books (including bestsellers such as Meditations), translated into 28 languages, with 30 editions, and over 3,200,000 copies. In March 2018, the first volume (Words of Life) was publishedof a series aimed at presenting systematically the heritage of her thought. Coeditors are Città Nuova Editrice and the Chiara Lubich Center, which was founded in 2008 to preserve her rich patrimony of thought and make it available in various formats to a wider public [88]. A selection:

Cornerstones of the spirituality of unity 
 That All May Be One: origins and life of the Focolare Movement, New City Press, New York, 1969
 May They All Be One, New City, London, 1977
 The Gen Revolution, New City Press, New York, 1972 
 A Little Harmless Manifesto, New City Press, New York, 1973;Manifesto, New City, London, 1975
 Meditations, New City Press, New York, 1988; New City, London, 2005 (4th edition)
 Yes Yes No No, New City, London, 1977
 Charity our Ideal, New City Press, New York, 1977; Charity, New City, London, 1981
 Where Two or Three, New City Press, New York, 1977; New City, London, 1977
 Servants of All, New City Press, New York, 1978; New City, London, 1979
 The Eucharist, New City Press, New York, 1978; New City, London, 1979
 Knowing How to Lose, New City, London, 1981
 Our Yes to God, New City Press, New York, 1982; New City, London, 1982
 When Did We See You, Lord?, New City Press, New York, 1983; Jesus in our Brother, New City, London, 1983
 Journey: Spiritual Insights, New City Press, New York, 1984 
 Jesus: The Heart of His Message: Unity and Jesus Forsaken, New City Press, New York, 1985; Why Have You Forsaken Me?, New City, London, 1985
 Diary 1964–65, New City Press, New York, 1987
 On the Holy Journey: Spiritual Messages, New City Press, New York, 1988 
 A Call to Love.Spiritual Writings, Volume 1, New City Press, New York, 1990
 When Our Love is Charity. Spiritual writings, Volume 2, New City Press, New York, 1991
 The Love that Comes from God. Reflections on the Family, New City Press, New York, 1993
 The Living Presence – Jesus in the Word, in the Eucharist and in our midst, New City Press, New York, 1997; New City, London, 1997
 Heaven on Earth, Meditations and Reflections, New City Press, New York, 2000
 The Cry of Jesus Crucified and Forsaken, New City Press, New York, 2001; New City, London, 2001
 A New Way: The spirituality of unity, New City Press, New York, 2002; New City, London, 2006
 Mary, Transparency of God, New City Press, New York, 2003;New City, London, 2003
 Essential Writings – Spirituality Dialogue Culture, New City Press, New York, 2007; New City, London, 2007

Posthumous publications 
 Early Letters: At the origins of a new spirituality, edited by F. Gillet and G. D'Alessandro, New City Press, New York, 2012
 God is Love, edited by F. Gillet, New City Press, New York, 2011
 Rays: Short Reflections on living God's will, edited by B. Hartnett, New City Press, New York, 2011
 God's Word to Us, edited by B. Hartnett, New City Press, New York, 2012
 Neighbors, Short Reflections on loving the people around us, edited by B. Hartnett, New City Press, New York, 2012
 The Pearl of the Gospel, Short Reflections on Mutual Love, edited by F. Gillet, New City Press, New York, 2013
 The Sun that Daily Rises, Short Reflections on the Eucharist, edited by F. Ciardi, New City Press, New York, 2014
 Unity, edited by D. Falmi, and F. Gillet, New City Press, New York, 201
 Jesus forsaken, edited by H. Blaumeiser, New City Press, New York, 2016; New City, London, 2016
 Mary, edited by B. Leahy and J. Povilus, New City Press, New York, 2018; New City, London, 2017
 The Holy Spirit, edited by R Silva and F. Gillet, New City Press, New York, 2018; New City, London, 2018
 The Church, edited by H. Blaumeiser and B. Leahy, New City Press, New York, 2019; New City, London, 2018
 Jesus in our Midst, edited by D. Falmi, and J. Povilus, New City Press, New York, 2019; New City, London, 2019

On various topics 
 Chiara Lubich, Here and Now: Meditations on living in the present, New City Press, New York, 2005; New City, London, 2000, 2014
 Chiara Lubich, TheArt of Loving, New City Press, New York,2010
 Chiara Lubich, Living Dialogue: Steps on the way to unity among Christians, New City Press, New York, 2009; New City, London, 2009
 Chiara Lubich, No Thorn without a Rose:99 Sayings, New City Press, New York, 2008
 Chiara Lubich, Only at Night We See the Stars, New City Press, New York, 2002; New City, London, 2002
 Chiara Lubich, From Scriptures to Life, New City Press, New York, 1991
 Chiara Lubich, Christmas Joy: Spiritual Insights by New City Press, London, New York, Manila, 1998
 Michel Pochet, Stars and Tears: a Conversation with Chiara Lubich, New City Press, New York, 1985; New City, London, 1985
 William Proctor, An Interview with Chiara Lubich, New City Press, New York, 1983
 Armando Tono, Chiara Lubich: A Biography, New City Press, New York, 2012
 Franca Zambonini, Chiara Lubich: A Life for Unity, New City Press, New York, 2012; New City, London, 1992
 Florence Gillet, Model of Incarnate Love, Mary Desolate in the experience and thought of Chiara Lubich, New City Press, New York, 2010
 Marisa Cerini, God who is Love, in the experience and thought of Chiara Lubich, New City Press, New York, 1992
 Florence Gillet, The Choice of Jesus Forsaken, in the theological perspective of Chiara Lubich, New City Press, New York, 2015
 Judith Povilus, United in His Name, Jesus in the Midst in the experience and thought of Chiara Lubich, New City Press, New York, 1992
 Florence Gillet, Fifteen Days of Prayer with Chiara Lubich, New City Press, New York, 2009
 Luigino Bruni, ed, The Economy of Communion, Toward a Multi-dimensional Economic Culture, New City Press, New York, 2002
 M. James, T. Masters, A. Uelmen, Educations’ Highest Aim, Teaching and Learning through a Spirituality of Communion, New City Press, New York, 2010
 T. Masters, A. Uelmen, Focolare: Living the Spirituality of Unity in the United States, New City Press, New York, 2011

See also
 Focolare Movement
 Igino Giordani
 Pasquale Foresi
 Economy of Communion
 List of peace activists

Notes 

1920 births
2008 deaths
People from Trento
Founders of Catholic religious communities
Roman Catholic activists
Templeton Prize laureates
Italian Servants of God
21st-century venerated Christians
Italian human rights activists
Commanders Crosses of the Order of Merit of the Federal Republic of Germany